Miloderoides is a genus of broad-nosed weevils in the beetle family Curculionidae. There are at least three described species in Miloderoides.

Species
These three species belong to the genus Miloderoides:
 Miloderoides cinereus (Van Dyke, 1935) i c g
 Miloderoides maculatus Van Dyke, 1936 i c g b
 Miloderoides vandykei Tanner, 1942 i c g
Data sources: i = ITIS, c = Catalogue of Life, g = GBIF, b = Bugguide.net

References

Further reading

 
 
 
 

Entiminae
Articles created by Qbugbot